{{Infobox film
| name           = Outcast
| image          = Outcast film poster.jpg
| alt            =
| caption        = UK release poster
| director       = Colm McCarthy
| producer       = {{ubl|John McDonnell|Brendan McCarthy<ref name="autogenerated1">{{cite web |url=http://www.iftn.ie/news/?act1=record&aid=73&rid=4282024&tpl=archnews&only=1 |title=Photography Wraps On 'Outcast |work=IFTN.ie |accessdate=14 August 2009}}</ref>}}
| writer         = 
| starring       = 
| music          = Giles Packham
| cinematography =
| editing        =
| studio         =
| distributor    = Vertigo Films
| released       = 
| runtime        = 98 minutes
| country        = United Kingdom
| language       = English
| budget         =
| gross          =
}}Outcast'' is a 2010 British supernatural horror thriller film directed by Colm McCarthy and starring James Nesbitt.

Plot
Cathal (James Nesbitt) is a killer who is pursuing his former lover Mary (Kate Dickie). Mary, a woman who comes from an ancient and magical Celtic race, and her son Fergal (Niall Bruton) hide in an outlying district of Edinburgh and use magic to protect themselves, but Cathal is determined to outsmart them. Local residents begin to die at the hands of an unidentified force, but it is unknown if Cathal is the killer, or if is he trying to destroy the beast.

Cast

Release
The film premiered in March 2010 as part of the South by Southwest. It was also screened at the 2010 Cannes Film Festival. The film was released as part of the Bloody Disgusting Selects line.

References

External links
 
 

2010 horror films
2010 films
British horror films
Vertigo Films films
Films set in Scotland
Films set in Edinburgh
Films shot in Edinburgh
English-language Irish films
2010s English-language films
2010s British films